The Pittsburgh Media Market is part of the Greater Pittsburgh region. It is primarily a definition of the reach of the Pittsburgh television and radio media as defined by Nielsen in a prime sense. The area is actually smaller than the true area of Pittsburgh media reach, since many counties of east central Ohio and the West Virginia panhandle are served exclusively by some Pittsburgh affiliates though also having a few locally based network signals.  

The Pittsburgh Media Market is officially defined as:

Maryland counties:
Garrett
West Virginia counties:
Monongalia
Preston
Pennsylvania counties:
Allegheny
Westmoreland
Fayette
Beaver
Armstrong
Butler
Washington
Indiana
Lawrence
Greene
And outside the Pittsburgh metropolitan area:
Clarion
Venango

See also

 List of United States television markets

External links
Pittsburgh Post-Gazette media market information
Yahoo! article on inclusion of West Virginia and Ohio counties into the market

Mass media in Pittsburgh